Barbara Elisabeth Baarsma (born 19 November 1969) is a Dutch economist, and Professor of Market Forces and Competition Issues at the University of Amsterdam.

Biography 
Born in Leiden, Baarsma grew up in Goeree-Overflakkee, where her father was otolaryngologist. After attending the Atheneum in Middelharnis, in 1988 she started studying Industrial Design at the Delft University of Technology. In 1989 she moved to the University of Amsterdam, where she received her MA cum laude in Economics in 1993, and her PhD in Economics in 2000 with a thesis entitled "Monetary valuation of environmental goods: Alternatives to contingent valuation" under the supervision of Jan Lambooy and Bernard van Praag.

After graduation in 2000 Baarsma was researcher at SEO Economic Research, where in 2002 she became head of the Cluster Competition and Regulation, in 2008 deputy director, and since 2009 director as successor of Jules Theeuwes. In 2009 she was appointed Professor of Market Forces and Competition at the University of Amsterdam. In 2012 she was elected as a member of the Social-Economic Council.

Publications 
Baarsma has authored and coauthored numerous publications. A selection:

References

External links 
 Barbara Baarsma at SEO Economic Research.

1969 births
Living people
Dutch economists
Dutch women economists
University of Amsterdam alumni
Academic staff of the University of Amsterdam
People from Leiden
People from Goeree-Overflakkee